The Buffalo River is the longest unimpounded river in Middle Tennessee in the United States. It flows  through the southern and western portions of that region. The Buffalo is the largest tributary of the Duck River. Canoeing is popular, especially in its middle section.  The river is named for the Buffalo fish which was abundant when the first European settlers arrived.

Sources
The Buffalo rises in northern Lawrence County. U.S. Highway 43 crosses both the North and South Forks. The confluence of the North and South forks about a mile west of Highway 43 is the head of the Buffalo.

Course

Below the confluence, the Buffalo trends northwest for several miles. After entering Lewis County, it intersects the Natchez Trace Parkway. The confluence with the Little Buffalo River occurs in Lewis County followed by smaller tributaries. State Route 99 parallels the river for a distance and then crosses it in the broad Texas Bottoms. In Lewis County, the river continues to meander westward. Entering northern Wayne County, the stream has several more tributaries, notably the Green River.

A few miles below the mouth of the Green River is the community of Flatwoods. Here State Route 13 bridges the Buffalo and then abruptly turns northerly for the balance of its flow. It crosses into Perry County near here. For most of its course through Perry County, the Buffalo roughly parallels State Route 13. Shortly after crossing into Humphreys County, it is bridged by Interstate 40 and then by Bakerville Road. About 8 miles north of this is the mouth of the Buffalo, its confluence with the Duck.

Watershed
The upper Buffalo River, in Lawrence County, is designated a "State Scenic River" under the Tennessee Wild and Scenic Rivers Act.

The only incorporated towns along the Buffalo, Linden and Lobelville, are in Perry County. Two unincorporated communities, Flatwoods and Beardstown are adjacent to the river in Perry County.

Hydrology
The Buffalo River watershed is the total land area that drains into the Buffalo River.  It is designated as Hydrologic Unit Code (HUC) 06040004 by the USGS.  It empties into watershed 06040003, the Lower Duck River watershed.

The Buffalo River watershed is composed of three sub-watersheds; two sections of the Buffalo River and the Cane Creek sub-watershed.  The southeastern part of the Buffalo River watershed is HUC 0604000401. It includes the headwaters of the Buffalo plus the Little Buffalo River and both Chief Creek and Fortyeight Creek. The western side and northern one-third of the watershed is HUC 0604000402. It reaches from the Green River in Wayne County at the southern end to the mouth of the Buffalo in Humphreys County.  Cane Creek, the third part of the watershed is HUC 0604000403.  Upper Cane Creek begins at the headwaters of the creek near Hohenwald in Lewis County. Lower Cane Creek includes the mouth at Beardstown in Perry County.

The Buffalo River watershed contains 1,200 miles of tributary streams. Impoundments include 349 lake acres in ponds and water stored behind 10 dams.  These dams are primarily in the southeastern portion of the watershed.  The majority of the impounded water is in Laurel Hill Lake with  plus an additional  in the VFW Lake. TDEC has also identified some wetlands sites in the southeastern portion of the watershed.

Land Use
Watershed land is primarily forests; 69% being deciduous, 3% is evergreen, and 4% is mixed forest.  The second significant land use is agricultural crops. Pasture and hay fields account for 10% of the area while row crops occupy another 8%.  Residential and commercial areas occupy less than 0.5% of the land.

The soil in the watershed is primarily loam with some silty loam. The soil pH varies from about 4.85 to 5.45. Portions of the area are characteristic karst topography.

Natural history
The Buffalo is rich in aquatic life. Fishing it through passive methods such as limb and trot lines is traditional. There are many catfish and other non-game fish such as drum. The largest aquatic animal usually found in the Buffalo is the alligator snapping turtle. It is often caught (usually unintentionally) on trot and limb lines. These turtles can weigh  or more.

TDEC lists 48 rare plant and animal species in the watershed. Rarity typically results from either a small population or a very restricted range. The non-aquatic species include 18 plants, one mammal, three birds, two reptiles, one amphibian, three insects and spiders, and one other invertebrate. There are 20 aquatic species associated with the river or its tributaries; 12 fish, one crustacean, three mussels, and four snails.

Fish
Identified rare fish in the Buffalo include eight varieties of Darters, one catfish (Saddled Madtom), and one Cavefish (Southern Cavefish).  Most of the identified darters are listed as either Threatened or Endangered by either the State or Federal government.
Ammocrypta vivax, Scaly Sand Darter
Cyprinella monacha, Spotfin Chub – Federal Threatened status
Etheostoma aquali, Coppercheek Darter – State level Threatened status
Etheostoma boschungi, Slackwater Darter – Federal Threatened status
Etheostoma cinereum, Ashy Darter – State level Threatened status
Etheostoma denoncourti, Golden Darter
Etheostoma pseudovulatum, Egg-Mimic Darter – State level Endangered status
Percina burtoni, Blotchside Darter
Percina macrocephala, Longhead Darter – State level Threatened status

Crustacean
The Alabama crayfish, Orconectes alabamensis is a rare crayfish species found near the Buffalo.

Mussels
Three species of mussels are among the rare species listed by TDEC. Both the Cracking Pearly Mussel and the Pale Lilliput are listed by both State and Federal authorities as Endangered.
Hemistena lata, Cracking Pearly Mussel
Quadrilla cylindrical cylindrical, Rabbitsfoot
Toxolasma cylindrellus, Pale Lilliput

Snails
Four species of rare snails are found near the Buffalo; none of them are included by TDEC on species concerns lists.
Leptoxis praerosa, Onyx Rocksnail
Lithasia duttoniana, Helmet Rocksnail
Lithasia geniculata fuliginosa, Geniculate Rocksnail
Lithasia geniculata fulginosa, Geniculate Riversnail

Geology

Except for a very small section on the southern end, the watershed is part of the Western Highland Rim, one of 25 Level IV subecoregions in the state. The dissected, rolling terrain is characterized by long ridges with steep sides and hollows deeply eroded into those ridges. The river flows in a wide flood plain of "bottom land".

The predominant geology of the area is that of Paleozoic limestones. The Mississippian limestone base along with chert and shale is overlaid by fairly thin soils of moderate fertility. These tend to be acidic. Much of the differential erosion leading to the terrain features results from differences in deposition and mineralization of the various types of limestone in the area and the presence of large portions of chert. Some chert bears small quantities of the iron-containing mineral hematite or other oxides of iron. During the mid-to-late 19th century there was considerable iron-ore related mining and smelting of Limonite ore.

The sizable tributary streams flow out of narrow hollows into the Buffalo; only the largest ones have true stream valleys of their own. Streams are typically clear with a moderate gradient.

Economy
Canoeing float trips significantly contribute to the area's economy. The area's remoteness depresses the local economy compared to that of the state as a whole. The Middle Tennessee Council of the Boy Scouts of America operates Grimes Canoe Base along the Buffalo in southern Perry County.  Several businesses provide commercial canoe and float access to the river for tourists.  The river is primarily a Class I stream with significant stretches of flat water.  Free float tubing is feasible in selected portions of the river.

There are three trails associated with the river.
 Buffalo River – Perry County – A scenic water trail through nature – 
 Ladies Bluff Trail – Perry County – A scenic, hiking, wilderness trail –  – Partially ADA compliant
 Linden City Park Walking Trail – Perry County – Health and fitness trail  – ADA compliant

River access

See also
List of rivers of Tennessee

References

External links

USGS WaterData: Stream Gauge Buffalo River near Flat Woods
NWS Advanced Hydrologic Prediction near Flat Woods
USGS WaterData: Stream Gauge Buffalo River below Lobelville
NWS Advanced Hydrologic Prediction below Lobelville
Buffalo River Watershed (06040004) - TDEC - Water Quality Management Plan

Rivers of Tennessee
Rivers of Perry County, Tennessee
Rivers of Lawrence County, Tennessee
Rivers of Lewis County, Tennessee
Rivers of Wayne County, Tennessee
Rivers of Humphreys County, Tennessee